The New York/New Jersey Hitmen were an American football team based in East Rutherford, New Jersey. The Hitmen were the members of the Eastern Division of the XFL. The team played their home games in Giants Stadium of the Meadowlands Sports Complex.

History

The team's general manager was former Dallas Cowboys wide receiver, and New Jersey native, Drew Pearson.

The Hitmen were part of the Eastern Division with the Birmingham Thunderbolts, Orlando Rage and Chicago Enforcers. They finished in 3rd place with a 4-6 record. The head coach was former NFL assistant Rusty Tillman, who was not a fan of the league's gimmicks or personalities – specifically commentator Jesse Ventura, who called him "Gutless Rusty" on a regular basis, as he felt that Tillman's coaching style was too timid. Tillman, ever the professional, brushed off the jabs by Ventura and refused to respond. In the end, Ventura's attempts to goad him failed.

The Hitmen were one of the teams to play in the XFL's inaugural game. Tens of millions of viewers watched the Hitmen, who displayed a stunning lack of competence against the Las Vegas Outlaws in the contest (including a particularly ugly missed field goal and numerous miscues from starting quarterback and New York native Charles Puleri), lose 19–0. The Hitmen's poor performance in that game was a major factor in fan backlash against the league in the weeks that followed and a prime example of the league's failure to live up to expectations; the team benched Puleri in favor of Wally Richardson by Week 3 in hopes of salvaging the season.

The Hitmen's average attendance of roughly 28,000 fans per game was second-highest in the league, behind only the San Francisco Demons.

Revival

In December 2018, a revival of the XFL announced its intent to return to East Rutherford. The new team was named the New York Guardians.

Season

|-
|2001 || 4 || 6 || 0 || 3rd Eastern || --
|}

Schedule

Regular season

Standings

Roster

Team leaders

Rushing yards: 328, Joe Aska.

Receiving yards: 404, Kirby Dar Dar.

Passing yards: 804, Wally Richardson.

Staff

References

 
XFL (2001) teams
Defunct American football teams in New Jersey
American football teams in the New York metropolitan area
Sports in East Rutherford, New Jersey
2001 establishments in New Jersey
2001 disestablishments in New Jersey